Ommatospila is a genus of moths of the family Crambidae. The genus was described by Julius Lederer in 1863.

Species
Ommatospila decoralis (Guenée, 1854)
Ommatospila descriptalis (Walker, 1866)
Ommatospila narcaeusalis (Walker, 1859)

References

Spilomelinae
Crambidae genera
Taxa named by Julius Lederer